Kosambi is an old city and Buddhist pilgrimage site in India.

Kosambi may also refer to:

Kosambi, Tangerang, a subdistrict of Tangerang Regency, Banten, Indonesia
Damodar Dharmananda Kosambi (1907–1966), Indian polymath
Dharmananda Damodar Kosambi (1876–1947), Buddhist scholar
Duri Kosambi, Cengkareng, an administrative village (kelurahan) of Cengkareng, West Jakarta, Indonesia